Betty Kobayashi Issenman (1921 – March 10, 2020) was a Canadian ethnologist. As an independent researcher, she was an expert in Inuit clothing.

She was appointed as a member to the Order of Canada in 2002.

Selected publications

 Sinews of Survival: The Living Legacy of Inuit Clothing (University of British Columbia Press,)

References

1921 births
2020 deaths
Canadian ethnologists
Women ethnologists
Members of the Order of Canada